George John Smith (1840–1918) was a Scottish Catholic clergyman who served as the Bishop of Argyll and the Isles from 1892 to 1918.

Born in Cuttlebrae, Banffshire, Scotland on 24 January 1840, he was ordained to the priesthood on 17 December 1864. He was appointed the Bishop of the Diocese of Argyll and the Isles by the Holy See on 31 December 1892, and consecrated to the Episcopate on 25 April 1893. The principal consecrator was Archbishop Angus MacDonald of St Andrews and Edinburgh, and the principal co-consecrators were Bishop Hugh MacDonald of Aberdeen and Bishop James August Smith of Dunkeld (later Archbishop of St Andrews and Edinburgh).

He died in office on 18 January 1918, aged 78.

References 

1840 births
1918 deaths
Roman Catholic bishops of Argyll and the Isles